

Africa

Asia

Europe

North America

Oceania

South America

See also
 List of cities by average temperature
 List of cities by sunshine duration
 List of weather records

References

Precipitation
Weather-related lists
Lists of cities
List of cities in Europe by precipitation